Bayanaul National Park (Baianauyl ūlttyq parkı) is a national park in Kazakhstan, located in southeastern Pavlodar Province, 140 kilometers from the industrially developed city of Ekibastuz, on the outskirts of the central Kazakh Uplands. It is included on the list of protected areas of Kazakhstan. The park was founded in 1985, making it Kazakhstan's first national park. It was created to preserve and restore the natural flora and fauna found in the extensive Bayanaul mountain range. The park's total area is 68,453 hectares.

In the summer of 1993, the first All-Republic Camp (National Jamboree) of the Organization of the Scout Movement of Kazakhstan, named "Jasybay's Arrow", was held at the national camp, Jasybay, named for a Kazakh mythic hero, near Bayanaul National Park.

In 2021, Bayanaul National Park was named one of the top 10 tourist destinations in Kazakhstan.

Geography

The park is located within the Bayanaul Range, part of the Kazakh Uplands. The mountains took shape during the Paleozoic Era and, subsequently, endured a long history of continental destruction, causing their relatively low current height (from 400 to 1027 meters above sea level). The highest point of the Bayanaul Range is Akbet mountain (1027 m). According to legend, the mountain is named in honor of Akbet, a girl who threw herself from its peak when she was given to marry someone whom she did not love.

There are four freshwater lakes on the territory of the park - Sabyndykol, Jasybay, Toraygir and Byrzhankol. Aside from these, there are many smaller lakes, some of which become significantly more shallow during the dry season.

The largest lake is Sabyndykol ( (Sabyndyköl), literally "soapy lake"), with the village of Bayanaul on its shore. The lake is named for its special, soft water, which feels almost soapy to the touch. According to legend, the beautiful Bayan dropped her soap in this lake while she was washing her hair.

The clearest and second largest lake is Jasybay, located in a hollow between two mountain ridges. Jasybay is a favorite place among tourists for swimming thanks to its clean water and the view from its beach. According to legend, the lake was named in honor of the Kazakh mythic hero Jasybay, who was killed on its shore in a battle with invaders.

Toraygir is the third in size and the highest above sea level. Its water is not as clear as Jasybay, and therefore it is less popular for swimming. However, many fish can be found in this lake, carp in particular, which makes it an enticing place for fishermen. This lake was named in honor of the Kazakh poet Sultanmahmut Toraygirov, who spent his childhood in this region. There is a museum dedicated to the poet in the village of Toraygir, which is not far from the lake and also named in his honor.

Byrzhankol is the smallest lake of the four, with a diameter of about 800 meters. On its shore is a village of the same name with 56 residents. This lake also presents an interest for fishermen, as different varieties of carp can be found in its waters. It gets its name from the Kazakh words Byr "one", zhan "soul" and kol "lake," which in translation means "lake of one soul."

Flora

Four kinds of vegetation can be found in the park: forest, forest-steppe, steppe and meadow.

The floristic diversity of the park consists of around 460 species, including the Bayanaul pine and the black alder. The Bayanaul pine is characterized by the fact that it grows primarily on rocks, creating a unique combination of rock and vegetation. The variety of vegetation in the park is particularly surprising, considering that it is located in the middle of a semi-desert steppe with meager vegetation. Along with birches, pines, alders and aspens, many bushes and shrubs spring up in the park, including berry-bearing varieties such as raspberries, rose hips, currants and hawthorns. Wild strawberries grow in the meadows, and mushrooms grow in the forests. There are up to 50 species of relict plants found in the park, including the relict black alder and the relict rock currant.

Fauna
Around 50 species of birds and 40 species of mammals inhabit Bayanaul National Park, including different types of forest game, as well as the argali, roe deer, European badger and squirrel. The park is particularly proud of its argali population, a rare and endangered species in need of protection, and included on the IUCN Red List.

Among the birds found in the park are cranes, swans, herons and bustards. The birds of prey present include eagles, kestrels and kites.

Climate and ecoregion
The climate of Bayanaul is Humid continental climate, warm summer (Köppen climate classification (Dfb)). The average annual temperature in the park is 3.2 °C. The average January temperature is -13.7 °C, with a minimum of -17.8 °C.

The average July temperature is 14.6 °C, with a maximum reaching 32.6 °C. The average frost free period is only 140 days. Annual precipitation is 340 mm with variation in some years from 190 to 494 mm. The average annual wind speed in Bayanaul is 2.9 m/s.

Although a continental climate is characteristic for the area, Bayanaul does not usually experience the strong winds and dust storms common in the steppe regions of Pavlodar Province.

Bayanaul is in the Kazakh Steppe ecoregion.

Tourism

Bayanaul is a tourist destination for the residents of nearby cities in central and northern Kazakhstan. The park has a large number of sanatoriums and recreational areas. However, most of these areas are equipped with only the most primitive of infrastructure, and living conditions are not up to modern standards. In particular, there is no sewage system, and the cottages have no source of drinking water or wash basins.

Nonetheless, this does not deter the many tourists that visit, drawn by the local natural environment and individual places that religious people consider to be sacred. Several types of recreation are available in the park, including swimming, hiking, rock climbing and mountain biking. Guided tours are offered in many areas of the park, where for a relatively small fee (around 500 tg as of 2007), one can see the main attractions of the park- a "holy cave", a "stone head", the rock "masculine dignity," and others. The most popular place for swimming is Jasybay lake, as it is the most clean and clear of the park's lakes, and contains views that many visitors find scenic. The largest number of recreational activities operate on the shores of this lake, and on its beach it is possible to rent catamarans, as well as row boats and motor boats.

Attractions

Of special interest to the tourists at Bayanaul are the large rocks and stones that have taken on bizarre shapes due to many centuries of erosion by wind and water. They often resemble animals, people, and other objects, such as a truck coming down the mountain. Among these is the sculpture known as the "stone head," which when viewed from a certain angle resembles the head of a bald, toothless old woman with a treacherous grin. Another equally well known creation of local nature is a rock called "masculine dignity," resembling the head of a penis. Among other rock forms are a camel, the heads of a mammoth and a gorilla, a flying saucer, a dinosaur, a dove, a horse head, and many others.

Popular among rock climbers are the Naizatas ("stone spear" translated from Kazakh), Bold Peak, and Akbet mountains, the park's highest point. At the top of Naizatas are six lakes, which dry out during the dry season.

Another local attraction is the "holy cave." According to superstition, if someone enters the cave, places their palm on the wall and makes a wish, then leaves without turning their head around to face the exit, their wish will come true. Another superstition exists that the cave helps infertile parents conceive offspring, for which there is a special ritual. Although this may not be true, the stream of tourists to the cave on the days that its open to the public continues. It is located at a considerable height and requires a walk of more than a kilometer to reach. In recent years, a wooden staircase has been built for the last section of the route, which is particularly steep.

Gallery

References

 Государственный Национальный Парк "Баян-Аул"

National parks of Kazakhstan
Protected areas established in 1985
Pavlodar Region
1985 establishments in the Soviet Union
Kazakh Uplands